Streethouse is a semi rural village in West Yorkshire, England that is situated to the east of Wakefield, the west of Featherstone and the south-west of Castleford. It is also situated on a Roman road.

History

A former mining village, Streethouse is currently a commuter village serving Wakefield, Normanton, Featherstone, Pontefract and Leeds.

Access
Streethouse railway station provides regular services to Pontefract and Wakefield with interconnecting services to Leeds and Sheffield. Junction 31 of the M62 is close by and the Glasshoughton Link Road has improved access to Wakefield and Castleford and relieved congestion on the M62.

Environs
Like many industrial areas, Streethouse suffered a period of decline. In recent years however, the village has enjoyed a considerable amount of investment from regeneration funds and private investment from housing companies. Some of the older, run down buildings are now earmarked for demolition but because of the developer going into administration no further work on the site has taken place. The village has a school, although children needing secondary education have to travel to nearby Featherstone, Crofton or Normanton. The area has a church, post office, one shop, Streethouse Cricket club, and a cafe. The former WMC is now demolished and new houses have been built on the site. There is also a park with a new children's playground and a separate playing field. Sharlston Country Park borders the village following the completion of surface mining on land from the former Sharlston Colliery.

The village also boasts 5-time Pontefract League Division One Champions, 1-time National Village Semi-finalists and 1-time Dyson-Skidmore trophy winners, the Streethouse Cricket Club. The local professional Rugby League club is Featherstone Rovers.

External links

 Website of Streethouse Cricket Club
 website of streethouse community
 
 

Villages in West Yorkshire
Featherstone